Liljana Lučić (born 1953 in Belgrade, Serbia). Lučić studied Sociology at the University of Belgrade Faculty of Philosophy. Her professional career she spent working as a Professor and Consultant at the Federal Agency for International Cultural and Educational Co-operation in Belgrade.

She has been a member of the Democratic Party since 1992.  She has been elected to serve as the President of the Executive Committee, the Secretary of the Party and also as Vice-President of the Democratic Party. She is currently a member of the General Committee of the Party.

She was a Member of the National Assembly of Serbia from the Democratic Party list between 1993 and 1997. From 2000 to 2006 she was a Member of Federal Assembly of the Federal Republic of Yugoslavia and Assembly of the State Union of Serbia and Montenegro. She was a delegate from the Assembly of State Union of Serbia and Montenegro to the Parliamentary Assembly of the Council of Europe.

In the Government of Serbia (2001-2004) she served as the Deputy Minister for Social Affairs. In July 2008 she was appointed State Secretary for Social Policy in the Ministry for Work and Social Policy.

References

External links
Serbian Ministry for Work and Social Policy (2008)
 Democratic Party

1953 births
Living people
Members of the National Assembly (Serbia)
Democratic Party (Serbia) politicians
20th-century Serbian women politicians
20th-century Serbian politicians
University of Belgrade Faculty of Philosophy alumni
21st-century Serbian women politicians
21st-century Serbian politicians
Women members of the National Assembly (Serbia)